Dockland or Docklands are areas occupied by, or in the neighbourhood of maritime docks, sometimes described as a Sailortown (dockland). The term is more common in Britain and British Commonwealth.

Specifically the term may refer to:
 Aarhus Docklands, Denmark
 Buenos Aires Docklands, Argentina
 , a distinctive office building on the Elbe in Hamburg 's Altona-Altstadt district
 Docklands, Victoria, Melbourne, Australia
 Docklands Stadium, a stadium in the Docklands area, currently known as Marvel Stadium
 Docklands Studios Melbourne, a film and television production facility
 Dublin Docklands, Dublin, Ireland
 Eastern Docklands, Amsterdam, Netherlands
 London Docklands, London, England

See also
 

Docks (maritime)